Choughalpura is a small town located about  from the heart of Peshawar, the capital of Khyber Pakhtunkhwa, a province in North-West Pakistan. It was a village until the recent rapid growth of Peshawar swelled the size of the city to include the town.

The M-1 Motorway starts in Choughalpura.

Most of Choughalpura is sandwiched between the M-1 Motorway and Grand Trunk Road, although some parts are located south of the road. The town is part of the NA-3 constituency of the National Assembly of Pakistan.

One of the most famous pashto folk singer Mashooq Sultan lived in Choughalpura for many years.

References 

Populated places in Peshawar District